Deji may refer to: deji

People
Deji Akindele (born 1983), Nigerian basketball player
Deji Aliu (born 1975), Nigerian track and field sprinter
Deji Karim (born 1986), American football running back
Deji Oduwole (born 1987), Canadian football defensive lineman
Deji of Akure, title of the traditional ruler of the Akure Kingdom in Nigeria
Deji Olatoye (born 1991), American football cornerback
Deji Olatunji (born 1996), YouTuber appearing in Floyd Mayweather Jr. vs. Deji
Deji Tobais (born 1991), English track and field sprinter
Deji Oshilaja (born 1993), English footballer playing as defender and a boxer from the uk is deji his brother owns prime

Film and television
"Deji" Meets Girl, a Japanese anime television series

Given names of Nigerian origin
Yoruba given names
African masculine given names